eBay Inc. is an American multinational e-commerce company based in San Jose, California, that facilitates consumer-to-consumer and business-to-consumer sales through its website. eBay was founded by Pierre Omidyar in 1995 and became a notable success story of the dot-com bubble. eBay is a multibillion-dollar business with operations in about 32 countries,  The company manages the eBay website, an online auction and shopping website in which people and businesses buy and sell a wide variety of goods and services worldwide. The website is free to use for buyers, but sellers are charged fees for listing items after a limited number of free listings, and an additional or separate fee when those items are sold.

In addition to eBay's original auction-style sales, the website has evolved and expanded to include: instant "Buy It Now" shopping; shopping by Universal Product Code, ISBN, or other kind of SKU number (via Half.com, which was shut down in 2017); and other services. eBay previously offered online money transfers as part of its services (via PayPal, which was a wholly owned subsidiary of eBay from 2002 to 2015); online classified advertisements (via Kijiji, or eBay Classifieds Group); and online event ticket trading (via StubHub). On July 25, 2018, eBay announced a new partnership with PayPal's rivals Apple and Square in place of its longtime payment partner PayPal.

History

1990s
The AuctionWeb was founded in California on September 3, 1995, by French-born Iranian-American computer programmer Pierre Omidyar as part of a larger personal site. One of the first items sold on AuctionWeb was a broken laser pointer for $14.83. Astonished, Omidyar contacted the winning bidder to ask if he understood that the laser pointer was broken; the buyer explained: "I'm a collector of broken laser pointers." It soon became the first online auction site allowing person-to-person transactions, and its popularity boomed.

Reportedly, eBay was simply a hobby for Omidyar until his Internet service provider informed him he would need to upgrade to a business account due to his high website traffic. The monthly price increase from $30 to $250 prompted him to start charging eBay users, who continued to use the site. Chris Agarpao was eBay's first employee; he processed mailed check payments.

Jeffrey Skoll was hired as the first new president of the company in early 1996. In November 1996, the E-Commerce platform entered into its first third-party licensing deal, with a company called Electronic Travel Auction, to use SmartMarket Technology to sell plane tickets and other travel products.

The company officially changed the name of its service from AuctionWeb to eBay in September 1997, after Echo Bay Technology Group, Omidyar's consulting firm. The domain name echobay.com was already taken by a gold mining company, so Omidyar shortened it to eBay.com. In 1997 the company received $6.7 million in funding from the venture capital firm Benchmark Capital.

The frequently repeated story that eBay was founded to help Omidyar's fiancée trade Pez candy dispensers was fabricated in 1997 by public relations manager Mary Lou Song to give the media a human-interest story more appealing than Omidyar's original vision of a "perfect market". The Pez dispenser myth generated enormous publicity and led to explosive early growth among toy collectors.

The leader in the toy category quickly became Beanie Babies manufactured by Ty, Inc., the most difficult toys to find in retail stores. As collectors internationally were trying to complete their collection of Beanie Babies, Ty set up the first business-to-consumer Web site, a secondary-market online trading post where people could trade their Beanie Babies. However, it was overwhelmed with unsortable listings, creating an urgent demand for a more efficient online trading system. Beanie Babies quickly became the dominant product on eBay, accounting for 10% of all listings in 1997, as collectors thronged eBay's user-friendly interface to search for specific Beanie Babies.

Meg Whitman was hired by the board as eBay president and CEO in March 1998. At the time, the company had 30 employees, half a million users and revenues of $4.7 million in the United States.

On September 21, 1998, eBay went public. In the risk factors section of the annual report filed with the US Securities and Exchange Commission in 1998, Omidyar notes eBay's dependence on the continued strength of the Beanie Babies market. After eBay went public, both Omidyar and Skoll became instant billionaires: eBay's target of $18 per share was all but ignored as the price went to $53.50 on the first day of trading.

2000s
As the company expanded product categories beyond collectibles into almost any saleable item, business grew quickly.  In 2000, eBay had 12 million registered users and a cyberinventory of more than 4.5 million items on sale on any given day. In 2001, eBay had the largest userbase of any e-commerce site. In February 2002 the company purchased iBazar, a similar European auction web site founded in 1998, and then bought PayPal on October 3, 2002.

By early 2008 the company had expanded worldwide, counting hundreds of millions of registered users as well as  employees and revenues of almost $7.7 billion. After nearly ten years at eBay, Whitman decided to enter politics. On January 23, 2008, the company announced that Whitman would step down on March 31, 2008, and John Donahoe was selected to become president and CEO. Whitman remained on the board of directors and continued to advise Donahoe through 2008. In late 2009 eBay completed the sale of Skype for $2.75 billion, but still owned 30% equity in the company.

2010s
In 2012, eBay was charged by the United States Department of Justice with entering into non-solicitation agreements with other technology companies involving their highly skilled employees.

On September 30, 2014, eBay announced it would spin off PayPal into a separate publicly traded company, a demand made nine months prior by activist hedge fund magnate Carl Icahn. The spinoff completed on July 18, 2015. eBay's then chief executive, John Donahoe, stepped down from that role. Flipkart and eBay entered into a strategic partnership in 2017 under which eBay Inc acquired a 5.44% stake in Flipkart in exchange for its eBay India business for $211 million and a $514 million cash investment. As part of the partnership, Flipkart decided to use the eBay platform for global outsourcing.

On January 31, 2018, eBay announced that they would replace PayPal as its primary payments provider with Netherlands-based start-up Adyen. The transition was set to be completed by 2021, but PayPal would remain an acceptable payment option on the site until further notice.

On September 21, 2018, it was reported that eBay would install a security fence around the perimeter of its San Jose headquarters in response to the YouTube headquarters shooting earlier that year.

On July 31, 2019, the company acquired a 5.59 percent stake in Paytm Mall.

On September 25, 2019, it was announced that Devin Wenig would be stepping down as eBay's CEO, and that Scott Schenkel, senior vice president and chief financial officer since 2015, had been appointed as the interim CEO.

2020s 
On April 13, 2020, it was announced that Jamie Iannone would become the CEO on April 27. On June 15, 2020, eBay stated that that five employees were terminated in September after a law enforcement notification in August because of a possibly criminal case of harassment of journalists perpetrated by some of the terminated employees. Six former employees were charged with Aggressive Cyberstalking.

In July 2020, Adevinta announced to acquire eBay Classifieds Group. The deal closed on June 25.

Corporate affairs

Board of directors
As of April 2022 the board of directors was as follows:

 Anthony Bates, CEO of Genesys
 Adriane M. Brown, advisor at Intellectual Ventures, LLC
 Diana Farrell, CEO of JPMorgan Chase Institute
 Logan Green, CEO of Lyft
 Bonnie Hammer, chairman, NBC Universal
 Carol Hayles, Chair of Audit Committee
 Jamie Iannone, CEO of eBay.
 Kathleen Mitic, CEO of Sitch, Inc.
 Matt Murphy, CEO of Marvell Technology Group
 Paul Pressler, Partner at Clayton, Dubilier & Rice, LLC, Chairman of eBay since 2020
 Mohak Shroff, SVP and Head of Engineering, LinkedIn
 Bob Swan, CEO of Intel Corporation
 Perry Traquina, CEO of Wellington Management Company

 Former board members
 Pierre Omidyar, director since 1996 and chairman of eBay from May 1996 to May 2015. In 2020, it was announced that he will be leaving the board, however, will still hold the director emeritus title. Additionally, he could still potentially attend board meetings if invited, but won't have the right to vote.
 Meg Whitman. She was president and CEO of eBay from 1998 to 2008.
 Jesse Cohn, Head of U.S. Equity Activism at Elliott Management Corporation. He joined the board in 2019 and left the next year.
 Thomas J. Tierney, co-founder of the Bridgespan Group, Chairman of eBay from 2003 until 2020
 Fred D. Anderson, former managing director of Elevation Partners, director of eBay from 2003 until 2020

Logo
In September 2012, eBay introduced a new logo using a thinner variation of the Univers typeface, installed on the website on October 10, 2012. It replaced the thicker Univers logo that had been used since eBay's inception in 1995.  An all red eBay logo with the same type set was also introduced to be used temporarily for various holidays.

Profit and transactions
eBay generates revenue by a complex system of fees for services, listing product features, and a final value fee for sales proceeds by sellers. As of 2019 the US-based eBay.com charges US$0.35 as an insertion fee for a basic listing without any adornments. The final value fee is 10-12% of the total amount of the sale, which is the price of the item plus shipping charges. Reduced final value fees are available to business registered customers. Other eBay websites follow a similar fee structure, but with different cost charges.

Under US law before 2018, a state could not require sellers located outside the state to collect a sales tax, which made making purchases on eBay more attractive to US buyers. Sellers that operate as a business do follow state tax regulations on eBay transactions. Since 2018, changes to tax law in the United States force eBay (and other large marketplaces) to collect sales tax on any eBay purchase shipped to certain states.

The company's business strategy includes increasing international trade. eBay has already expanded to over two dozen countries, including China and India. Strategic international expansion has failed in Taiwan and Japan, where Yahoo! had a head start, and New Zealand, where Trade Me is the dominant online auction website. eBay also notably failed in China due to competition from local rival Taobao. eBay entered the Chinese market in 2002 and shut down its Chinese site in 2007. In India, eBay's operations came to a halt after it sold off its India operations to country's largest ecommerce company Flipkart, in the latter's $1.4Bn fundraise, where eBay was a participant.

In its Q1 2008 results, total payment volume via PayPal increased 17%, but of the eBay auction site it was up 61%.

For most listing categories, eBay sellers are permitted to offer a variety of payment systems such as Escrow.com, PayPal, Paymate, Propay, and Skrill. Propay and Skrill were banned effective September 27, 2015, citing low usage.

Escrow.com is eBay's approved escrow site. The transactions processed through Escrow.com largely are in relation to eBay Motors; however, they are not restricted to this type of listing.

eBay runs an affiliate program under the name eBay Partner Network. eBay affiliate marketers were originally paid a percentage of the eBay seller's transaction fees, with commissions ranging from 50% to 75% of the fees paid for an item purchased. In October 2009, eBay changed to an affiliate payout system that it calls Quality Click Pricing, in which affiliates are paid an amount determined by an undisclosed algorithm. The total earnings amount is then divided by the number of clicks the affiliate sent to eBay and is reported as Earnings Per Click, or EPC. In October 2013, ePN launched a new pricing model. The new model is more transparent and is based on category-level base commission rates with bonuses available for referring new and reactivated buyers.

On April 18, 2012, eBay reported a 29% Q1 revenue increase to $3.3 billion compared to their Q1 in 2011. Net income was reported to be at $570 million for the quarter.

For the fiscal year 2017, eBay reported losses of US$1.016 billion, with annual revenue of US$9.567 billion, an increase of 6.6% over the previous fiscal cycle. eBay's shares traded at over $35 per share, and its market capitalization was valued at over US$27.2 billion in October 2018.

Environmental record
On May 8, 2008, eBay announced the opening of its newest building on the company's North Campus in San Jose, which is the first structure in the city to be built from the ground up to LEED Gold standards. The building, the first the company had built in its 13-year existence, uses an array of 3,248 solar panels, spanning , and providing 650 kilowatts of power to eBay's campus. The array can supply 15–18% of the company's total energy requirements, reducing the amount of greenhouse gases that would be produced to create that energy by other means. SolarCity, the company responsible for designing the array, estimates that the solar panels installed on eBay's campus will prevent 37 million pounds of carbon dioxide from being released into the environment as a result of replaced power production over the next three decades. Creating an equivalent impact to remove the same amount of carbon dioxide from the atmosphere would require planting  of trees.

The design of the building also incorporates other elements to reduce its impact on the environment. The building is equipped with a lighting system that detects natural ambient light sources and automatically dims artificial lighting to save 39% of the power usually required to light an office building. eBay's newest building also reduces demand on local water supplies by incorporating an eco-friendly irrigation system, and low-flow showerheads and faucets. Even during construction, more than 75% of the waste from construction was recycled. eBay also runs buses between San Francisco and the San Jose campus to reduce the number of commuting vehicles. In 2014, eBay and several other Oregon businesses signed the Oregon Business Climate Declaration to promote local job growth and slow carbon pollution.

Former subsidiaries and investments

PayPal
On October 3, 2002, PayPal became a wholly owned subsidiary of eBay. Its corporate headquarters were sited in San Jose, California, United States at eBay's North First Street satellite office campus. On September 30, 2014, eBay Inc. announced the divestiture of PayPal as an independent company, which was completed on July 20, 2015.

Craigslist
In the summer of 2004, eBay acknowledged that it had acquired 25% of classified listings website Craigslist. Former Craigslist executive Phillip Knowlton was the seller, and he insisted that his former employer was aware of his plans to divest his holdings. Initially, eBay assured Craigslist that eBay would not ask Craigslist to change the way it did business.

In March 2005, eBay launched the classifieds service Kijiji. In April 2008, eBay sued Craigslist to "safeguard its four-year financial investment", claiming that in January 2008, Craigslist took actions that "unfairly diluted eBay's economic interest by more than 10%". Craigslist countersued in May 2008 "to remedy the substantial and ongoing harm to fair competition" that Craigslist claimed was constituted by eBay's actions as a Craigslist shareholder. In September 2010, Delaware Judge William Chandler ruled that the actions of Craigslist were unlawful and that the actions were taken by Craigslist founders Jim Buckmaster and Craig Newmark had "breached their fiduciary duty of loyalty", and restored eBay's stake in the company to 28.4% from a diluted level of 24.85%. However, the judge dismissed eBay's objection to a staggered board provision, citing that Craigslist has the right to protect its own trade secrets. eBay spokesman Michael Jacobson stated "We are very pleased that the court gave eBay what it sought from the lawsuit."

Skype
In October 2005, eBay Inc. acquired Skype Technologies, developer of the Skype VoIP and Instant messaging service, significantly expanding its customer base to more than 480 million registered users worldwide. eBay later sold a majority stake in Skype in November 2009, while retaining a minority investment. This eventually led to the sale of the entire Skype business to Microsoft for $8.5 billion in May 2011.

StubHub
StubHub's acquisition by eBay was announced in January 2007 for a reported $310 million. According to CNN Money, 2007 was a very successful year for the company, handling five million individual transactions, more than in the previous six years combined of its history. Staffing at StubHub had increased to 350 workers by the time of the sale. Eight months after the acquisition, StubHub reached an exclusive agreement with Major League Baseball (MLB). They get a piece of the 25% in commissions StubHub earns on either end of a sale. Ticketmaster filed a lawsuit against StubHub and eBay in 2007, alleging "intentional interference" with Ticketmaster's contractual rights. In November 2019, eBay agreed to sell StubHub to Viagogo for $4.05 billion in cash; the sale was completed in February 2020.

Qoo10.jp
In April 2018, eBay acquired the Japanese division of Qoo10, a market place driven by Giosis and having the fourth GMV in Japan, for a reported $573 million. With the close of the transaction, eBay also has relinquished its investment in Giosis’ non-Japanese businesses.  This acquisition expands eBay's footprint in Japan, one of the largest e-commerce markets in the world. eBay made an initial investment in Giosis Pte. Ltd. in 2010.  Since then, Giosis has established dynamic marketplace businesses across Asia. eBay's Japan business, including Giosis’ Japan business, will report into Jooman Park, senior vice president of eBay's Asia Pacific region.

Service functionality
eBay is a publicly visible market which has attracted interest from economists, who have used it to analyze aspects of buying and selling behavior, auction formats, etc., comparing them with previous theoretical and empirical findings.

Computer information systems researchers have also shown interest in eBay. Michael Goul, Chairman of the Computer Information Systems department of the W. P. Carey School of Business at Arizona State University, published an academic case based on eBay's big data management and use in which he discusses how eBay is a data-driven company that processes 50 petabytes of data a day.

eBay uses a system that allows different departments in the company to check out data from their data mart into sandboxes for analysis. According to Goul, eBay has already experienced significant business successes through its data analytics. eBay employs 5,000 data analysts to enable data-driven decision making.

Third party
In 2006, the accounting software company Intuit launched a web-based donation tracking service called ItsDeductible. The service uses data from eBay to help users assign a market value to the items they donate.

Visual search
In July 2017, eBay released an image search capability allowing users to find listings on the site that match an item depicted in a photo, using artificial intelligence and machine learning technologies.

GCHQ
UK's GCHQ has a suite of tools for monitoring target use of eBay, named ELATE.

Items
Millions of collectibles, decor, appliances, computers, furnishings, equipment, domain names, vehicles, and other miscellaneous items are listed, bought, or sold daily on eBay. In 2006, eBay launched its Business & Industrial category, breaking into the industrial surplus business. Generally, anything can be auctioned on the site as long as it is not illegal and does not violate the eBay Prohibited and Restricted Items policy. Services and intangibles can be sold, too. Large international companies, such as IBM, sell their newest products and offer services on eBay using competitive auctions and fixed-priced storefronts. Separate eBay sites such as eBay US and eBay UK allow the users to trade using the local currency. Software developers can create applications that integrate with eBay through the eBay API by joining the eBay Developers Program. In June 2005, there were more than 15,000 members in the eBay Developers Program, comprising a broad range of companies creating software applications to support eBay buyers and sellers as well as eBay Affiliates.

Numerous government and police agencies around the world now use eBay as well as traditional auctions to dispose of seized and confiscated goods.

Controversy has arisen over certain items put up for bid. For instance, in late 1999 a man offered one of his kidneys for auction on eBay, attempting to profit from the potentially lucrative (and, in the United States, illegal) market for transplantable human organs.

Beginning in August 2007, eBay required listings in "Video Games" and "Health & Beauty" to accept its payment system PayPal and sellers could only accept PayPal for payments in the category "Video Games: Consoles". Starting January 10, 2008, eBay said sellers can only accept PayPal as payment for the categories "Computing > Software", "Consumer Electronics > MP3 Players", "Wholesale & Job Lots > Mobile & Home Phones", and "Business, Office & Industrial > Industrial Supply / MRO". eBay announced that starting in March 2008, eBay had added to this requirement that all sellers with fewer than 100 feedbacks must offer PayPal and no merchant account may be used as an alternative. This is in addition to the requirement that all sellers from the United Kingdom have to offer PayPal.

Further, and as noted below, it was a requirement to offer PayPal on all listings in Australia and the UK. In response to concerns expressed by the Australian Competition & Consumer Commission, however, eBay has since removed the policy on the eBay.com.au website requiring sellers to offer PayPal as a payment option.

On April 24, 2006, eBay opened its new eBay Express site, which was designed to work like a standard Internet shopping site for consumers with United States addresses. Before it closed in 2008, selected eBay items were mirrored on eBay Express, where buyers used a traditional digital shopping cart to purchase from multiple sellers. The UK version was launched to eBay members in mid-October 2006, but on January 29, 2008, eBay announced its intention to close the site. The German version, eBay Express Germany, was also opened in 2006 and closed in 2008.

At the 2008 eBay Developer's Conference, eBay announced the Selling Manager Applications program (SM Apps). The program allows approved developers to integrate their applications directly into the eBay.com interface. The applications created by developers are available for subscription by eBay members who also subscribe to Selling Manager.

eBay maintains a number of specialty sites including the discussion boards, groups, answer center, chat rooms, and reviews and guides. eBay's mobile offerings include SMS alerts, a WAP site, Java ME clients, and mobile applications for Windows Phone, Android OS, and Apple iPhone.

The initiative Choice in eCommerce was founded on May 8, 2013, by several online retailers in Berlin, Germany. The cause was, in the view of the initiative, sales bans and online restrictions by individual manufacturers. The dealers felt cut off from their main sales channel and thus deprived them the opportunity to use online platforms like Amazon, eBay, or Rakuten in a competitive market for the benefit of their customers.

Unusual items

Many unusual items have been placed for sale on eBay, including at least two previously undiscovered species, including the Coelopleurus exquisitus sea urchin.

Prohibited or restricted items
In its earliest days, eBay was nearly unregulated. However, as the site grew, it became necessary to restrict or prohibit auctions for various items. Note that some of the restrictions relate to eBay.com (the US site), while other restrictions apply to specific European sites (such as Nazi paraphernalia). Regional laws and regulations may apply to the seller or the buyer. Generally, if the sale or ownership of an item is regulated or prohibited by one or more states, eBay will not permit its listing. Among the hundred or so banned or restricted categories:

Bidding

Auction-style listings

Bidding on eBay (old or new)'s auction-style listing is called proxy bidding and is essentially equivalent to a Vickrey auction (sealed-bid), with the following exceptions.
 The winning bidder pays the second-highest bid plus one bid increment amount (that is, some small predefined amount relative to the bid size), instead of simply the highest bid. However, since the bid increment amounts are relatively insignificant compared to the bid size, they are not considered from a strategic standpoint.
 The highest bidder's bid is sealed, as in a Vickrey auction, but the current winning bid (second highest plus one increment) is displayed throughout the auction to allow price discovery.
 Because eBay's auction-style listings are sealed-bid, it is usually to all bidders' advantage that bids are made only at the very end of the auction (except for an initial minimum bid, that cancels out a "Buy It Now" option, or prevents the seller from ending the listing early). Early bids will usually not increase the bidder's chance of winning the auction, and will often raise the item's final price (winning bid) for the eventual winner.
 eBay also allows sellers to offer a "Buy it Now" price that will end the auction immediately. The Buy It Now price is available until someone bids on the item, or until the reserve price is met. When the Buy It Now option disappears, the auction-style listing proceeds normally.

Seller ratings
In 2008, eBay implemented a system of seller ratings with four categories. Buyers are asked to rate the seller in each of these categories with a score of one to five, with five being the highest rating. Unlike the overall feedback rating, these ratings are anonymous; neither sellers nor other users learn how individual buyers rated the seller. The listings of sellers with a rating of 4.3 or below in any of the four rating categories appear lower in search results. Power Sellers are required to have scores in each category above 4.5.

In a reversal of roles, on January 24, 2010, Auctionbytes.com held an open survey in which sellers could rate eBay, as well as competing auction and marketplace sites. In the survey, users were asked to rank 15 sites based on five criteria: profitability, customer service, communication, ease of use, and recommendation.

eBay was ranked 13th, after other large sites such as Amazon and Craigslist, as well as lesser-known selling sites such as Atomic Mall, eCRATER, and Ruby Lane. In individual category rankings, eBay was rated the worst of all the 15 sites on customer service and communication, and average on ease of use. Some respondents stated they would have given eBay a rating of 10, three to five years ago. eBay was rated twelfth out of fifteen in the Recommended Selling Venue category.

Charity auctions
Using MissionFish as an arbiter, eBay allows sellers to donate a portion of their auction proceeds to a charity of the seller's choice. The program is called eBay Giving Works in the US, and eBay for Charity in the UK. eBay provides a partial refund of seller fees for items sold through charity auctions. As of March 4, 2010, $154 million has been raised for US nonprofits by the eBay Community since eBay Giving Works began in 2003.

Some high-profile charity auctions have been advertised on the eBay home page. As of June 2010, the highest successful bid on a single item for charity was for the annual "Power Lunch" with investor Warren Buffett at the famous Smith & Wollensky Steakhouse in New York. The winning bid was $2.63 million with all of the proceeds going to the Glide Foundation. The winning bidder was not made public, but was able to bring up to seven friends to the lunch. In 2012, a higher bid, of $3.46 million, also going to the Glide Foundation, won a lunch with Buffet. In 2016 an anonymous bidder won a $3.45 million lunch with Warren Buffett and the money raised from the auction was given to Glide Foundation.

The previous highest successful bid on a single item for charity was for a letter sent to Mark P. Mays, CEO of Clear Channel (parent company of Premiere Radio Networks the production company that produces The Rush Limbaugh Show and Glenn Beck Program) by Senator Harry Reid and forty other Democratic senators, complaining about comments made by conservative talk show host Rush Limbaugh. The winning bid was $2,100,100, with all of the proceeds going to the Marine Corps-Law Enforcement Foundation, benefiting the education of children of men and women who have died serving in the armed forces. The winning bid was matched by Limbaugh in his largest charity donation to date.

In 2007, eBay Canada partnered with Montreal-based digital branding agency CloudRaker to develop a campaign to raise money for Sainte-Justine children's hospital in Montreal. They aligned themselves with Internet phenomenon Têtes à claques to create an eBay auction based on popular T-A-C character Uncle Tom, an infomercial host who pitches absurd products. eBay and CloudRaker reproduced Uncle Tom's imaginary products, The Body Toner Fly Swatter, The Willi Waller Potato Peeler, and the LCD Shovel and sold them online. In six weeks, they raised $15,000 for Hôpital St-Justine with one fly swatter, one potato peeler, and one shovel, a world record. The Body Toner Fly Swatter sold for $8,600, the Willi Waller Potato Peeler sold for $3,550, and the LCD Shovel sold for $2,146.21.

Shipping
During auction setup, eBay provides shipping-method choices to sellers: ordinary mail, express mail, and/or courier service. The seller may choose to offer only one shipping method to buyers, or the seller may offer buyers a choice of options.

Since 2012, eBay has been enlisting sellers into its "Global Shipping Program". If a seller uses the program, non-domestic buyers pay a fee to Pitney Bowes. The seller sends the item to a Pitney Bowes facility in the US (or the UK), which then forwards it to the buyer, taking care of all international shipping requirements. The program is claimed to enhance the product selection available to international buyers.

In March 2022, eBay stopped shipping in Russia and Ukraine due to the 2022 Russian invasion of Ukraine.

Criticisms and controversies

Common eBay criticisms involve concerns over fraud, forgeries and intellectual property violations in auction items. There are also issues of how negative feedback after an auction can offset the benefits of using eBay as a trading platform. eBay has been criticized for not paying UK taxes: the Sunday Times reported in October 2012 that eBay paid only £1.2m in tax on sales of over £800m.

2014 security breach
On May 21, 2014, the company revealed that the consumer database of usernames, passwords, phone numbers, and physical addresses had been breached between late February and early March. Users were advised to change their passwords; to expedite this, a "change password" feature was added to profiles of users who had not yet done so. The Syrian Electronic Army took responsibility for the attack. The SEA said that even though the hack revealed millions of users' banking details to them, they would not misuse the data. They had replaced the front pages of the websites with their own logo, called "Defacing" in technical terms. The hack caused eBay's share price to crash in intra-day trade as a result of the breach of security.

Stalking scandal 

A cyberstalking and harassment campaign conducted in 2019 against an online newsletter led to charges made public in 2020 against seven members of eBay's global security team, as well as arrests of two of those charged.  Wenig, the company's CEO at the time of the harassment campaign, has not been charged.

See also
 Alibaba Group, Chinese e-commerce company
 eBay v. Bidder's Edge
 Tiffany (NJ) Inc. v. eBay Inc.
 Shopping neutral
 ShopWorn

References

External links

 
 ebay - YouTube

 
1995 establishments in California
1998 initial public offerings
Android (operating system) software
Companies based in San Jose, California
Companies listed on the Nasdaq
American companies established in 1995
Retail companies established in 1995
Internet properties established in 1995
IOS software
Multinational companies headquartered in the United States
National Medal of Technology recipients
WatchOS software
Webby Award winners
Windows Phone software
Windows software
Flipkart acquisitions
Online marketplaces of the United States
Classified advertising websites